Pudding Creek is a  long 2nd order tributary to the Banister River in Pittsylvania County, Virginia.

Course 
Pudding Creek rises in a pond about 2 miles east-southeast of Woods Store, Virginia and then flows northeast to join the Banister River about 0.5 miles northeast of Jones Mill.

Watershed 
Pudding Creek drains  of area, receives about 45.9 in/year of precipitation, has a wetness index of 439.65, and is about 37% forested.

See also 
 List of Virginia Rivers

References 

Rivers of Virginia
Rivers of Pittsylvania County, Virginia
Tributaries of the Roanoke River